The Democratic People's Party is a minor conservative political party of South Korea. It was formed in 2000 by disaffected members of the Grand National Party. In the 2000 election, two members were elected to the National Assembly.

A political party by the same name existed during the 1950s, during the First Republic of South Korea.

Electoral results

See also
Politics of South Korea

2000 establishments in South Korea
Conservative parties in South Korea
Political parties established in 2000
Political parties in South Korea